The 2011 North American heat wave was a deadly summer 2011 heat wave that affected the Southern Plains, the Midwestern United States, Eastern Canada, the Northeastern United States, and much of the Eastern Seaboard, and had Heat index/Humidex readings reaching upwards of . On a national basis, the heat wave was the hottest in 75 years.

July 2011

Before the start of the heat wave, two derecho events took place; one on July 11 over most of the central Plains, the lower Great Lakes and the Appalachian region; the other on July 17 over eastern Ontario, southern Quebec and northern New England. Such forcing events often occur on the northern periphery of vast areas of continental heat domes that move northward during the summer months. On July 21, 2011, hot weather over the past week culminated into record-breaking temperatures across the province of Ontario, also in Michigan, Ohio, upstate New York and Quebec, shattering long held records. Toronto reached  for the first time in nearly 10 years. The humidex reached  at the downtown station by late afternoon. It was deemed so hot that the unusual decision was made to close the dome at the Rogers Centre during the Toronto Blue Jays baseball game, usually done in the event of cold weather or rain.  
 
The heat was blamed for at least 22 deaths across the Midwest and the Northeast. Daily high temperatures warmer than normal began on the southern plains during May 2011, accompanied by one of the most severe droughts ever recorded.

August 2011
In Oklahoma, by August 3, several locations in the southwestern portion of the state had recorded 43 consecutive days exceeding . Air temperatures exclusive of heat index exceeded  for much of the state on August 2 and 3, reaching  in Poteau and Wilburton on August 3.

As of August 10, Dallas/Fort Worth had recorded 40 consecutive days with high temperatures exceeding , the second-longest streak on record (the record of 42 days was set during the 1980 United States heat wave). However, by September 13, Dallas had endured 71 non-consecutive days with temperatures exceeding , beating the record of 69 days set in 1980.

On August 24, a 5-hour long severe thunderstorm hit Southern Ontario that evening which also spawned a pair of weak tornadoes, nothing particularly unusual for August, but it set records for lightning frequency, thought to be fueled by abnormally high Lake Ontario water surface temperatures due to the heat wave.

Record heat
The National Climatic Data Center in Asheville, North Carolina reported that the United States had the hottest summer on record in 2011. Since 1901, only the Dust Bowl era summer of 1936 was hotter. Texas, Oklahoma, New Mexico and Louisiana all reported their hottest summer on record. Delaware had a record warm July in 2011. Based on an index of residential energy demand, 2011 was the hottest summer on record. However, the states of Oregon and Washington recorded cooler than average summers, while California recorded its wettest.

Water levels
The continuing heat and drought resulted in several lakes dropping to record lows, particularly in Texas and Oklahoma. This resulted in re-exposing old towns and other historical sites that were submerged by dam construction. The original site of Bluffton, Texas was re-exposed, revealing a town site that had been submerged under Lake Buchanan since a dam was completed in 1939. The town of Woodville, Oklahoma was also re-exposed as Lake Texoma dropped.

Arkansas

Little Rock, Arkansas
Little Rock, Arkansas was the 2nd hottest city during the heat wave (Dallas, Texas was number 1). Temperature readings were as high as 113 °F on August 3, 2011.

Colorado

Colorado Springs, Colorado
In Colorado Springs, temperatures reached  (near record highs) as early as June. Daytime highs in June, July, and August were about 6° F above average. Temperatures were elevated during the heat wave, but remained cooler than temperatures in the Great Plains to the east.

Pueblo, Colorado

Denver, Colorado
This broke the record of  set back in 1978. This temperature broke the previous record of  set back in 1991.

Wyoming

Cheyenne, Wyoming
Cheyenne, Wyoming also recorded above average temperatures during the heat wave. On August 5, 2011, Cheyenne was  compared to the  average.

Kansas

Wichita, Kansas
Fully subjected to the heat wave, Wichita had an unusually hot summer in 2011. Wichita reached a temperature of  twice over the course of the heat wave, once in July, and once in August. Daytime highs in the months of June, July, and August averaged almost 9 °F over prior observed normals. The year was also substantially drier than average.

Oklahoma

Oklahoma City, Oklahoma
Oklahoma City, Oklahoma experienced extremely hot temperatures in the summer of 2011, and below normal rainfall. While winter, spring, and fall temperatures were close to normals, Central Oklahoma started to experience abnormally high temperatures after a very wet month of May. High temperatures in the months of June, July, and August were 9 °F above normals, and overnight lows were also significantly above norm. The heat was so extreme, that OGE, the area's main electricity provider, refused to cut off electric service in the month of August, as it felt that this might result in deaths among the elderly, many of whom used electric power to air-condition their homes. Due to the urban heat island effect, most of the urban area of Oklahoma City was even hotter than the temperatures recorded at the airport. The heat wave finally ended on September 15, 2011, when a cold front moved through Central Oklahoma.

Lawton, Oklahoma
Lawton, Oklahoma experienced even hotter weather than Oklahoma City reported. In Lawton, daytime high temperatures during the months of June, July, and August averaged 11 °F above the previously observed normals, and nighttime lows averaged 8 °F above normal. In at least one weather station in Lawton, less than half the normal rainfall was recorded over the course of the year, and almost none was recorded during the summer.

Tulsa, Oklahoma
Tulsa, Oklahoma was also affected by the heat wave with temperatures maxing out  on August 5, 2011. On August 8, 2011, high temperatures reached , almost breaking the record high temperature of  set back in 1935. Up until October, temperatures in the city remained in the high 80s to the low 100s.

Texas

Dallas, Texas
Dallas, Texas was affected by the heat wave. In Dallas, temperatures in the months of June, July, and August averaged 8 °F above normals. Dallas also received a below normal amount of precipitation during the year, and no measurable rainfall in July.

Amarillo, Texas
The Amarillo, Texas area, along with the rest of Texas and the Southern Plains, experienced the worst of the heat wave. For the months of June, July, and August, average highs were 10 °F above normal, and overnight low temperatures were 6 °F above normal.

See also
2010–13 Southern United States and Mexico drought

References

2011 heat waves
Heat waves in Canada
Heat waves in the United States
2011 meteorology
2011 disasters in Canada